Rock Dog ( literally "Rock and Roll Tibetan Mastiff") is a 2016 computer-animated comedy film produced by Mandoo Pictures and Huayi Brothers. The film is directed by Ash Brannon in his solo directorial debut, from a script by Brannon and Kurt Voelker. The film based on the Chinese graphic novel Tibetan Rock Dog by Zheng Jun, albeit its basic premise has been significantly altered. It features the voices of Luke Wilson, J. K. Simmons, Eddie Izzard, Lewis Black, Kenan Thompson, Mae Whitman, Jorge Garcia, Matt Dillon, and Sam Elliott. The film follows a young Tibetan Mastiff who leaves his mountain home village to become a rock musician in the big city after a radio falls from the sky.

It was released on July 8, 2016, in China by Huayi Brothers and on February 24, 2017, in the United States by Summit Premiere. The film received mixed reviews from critics and underperformed at the box office, grossing $24 million worldwide against a production budget of $60 million. The film is dedicated to producer David B. Miller who died while riding his mountain bike near his Topanga home.

A sequel titled Rock Dog 2: Rock Around the Park was released on June 15, 2021 on DVD and Blu-ray.Another sequel titled Rock Dog 3: Battle the Beat was released at the end of 2022.

Plot
Teenage Tibetan Mastiff Bodi (Luke Wilson) is expected to be the next guard of the village of Snow Mountain, succeeding his father Khampa (J. K. Simmons), who years ago drove out a pack of gangster grey wolves, led by the villainous Linnux (Lewis Black). Khampa has some local sheep disguised as Mastiffs to give the illusion the village has multiple guards to keep the wolves at bay, but Bodi has trouble perfecting his father's signature move the Iron Paw, which projects a powerful blast that can only happen if Bodi "finds the fire." Khampa has forbidden music in the village as it distracted Bodi from his duties when he was younger.

After a disastrous training session, Bodi indirectly causes a nearby flying plane to drop a package. Among the items, Bodi becomes interested in a radio and listens to rock music, becoming entranced with British rock legend Angus Scattergood (Eddie Izzard). Bodi steals a traditional dramyin from a den of locked up instruments, adds additional strings to make it a conventional Western guitar, and neglects his duties in favor of becoming a musician, putting him at odds with his father. After Khampa and some of the guard sheep accidentally cause Bodi to unleash a false alarm on the village while dressed as wolves (in an attempt to scare him straight), village elder Fleetwood Yak (Sam Elliott) convinces Khampa to let Bodi follow his dream. Bodi is given a bus ticket to a nearby city, but Khampa makes him promise to give up music if his trip doesn't work out. At the bus station, Bodi is discovered by two of Linnux's henchman, Riff (Kenan Thompson) and Skozz, and he orders them to kidnap Bodi, reasoning it is his chance to take over Snow Mountain.

Bodi arrives at the city, and heads to Rock and Roll Park as it is where Scattergood began his career. He attempts to join a band consisting of the down-to-earth fox Darma (Mae Whitman) and absent-minded goat drummer Germur (Jorge Garcia). However, Bodi is humiliated after losing a guitar contest to arrogant snow leopard Trey (Matt Dillon), who was a bounty hunter sent by Linnux to sabotage his musical dream and kidnap him. Trey, discovering his idolization for Scattergood, manipulates Bodi into convincing Scattergood to give him some guitar lessons at his mansion, though he knows a little secret about Angus' security set-up. At Scattergood's mansion, he is revealed to be a white Persian cat who wears black sunglasses all the time and has a serious case of writer's block, with his only companion being his robot butler Ozzie. Angus' manager, Ian, gives him three days to create a new song.

When Bodi tries to meet Scattergood, he is put off by Bodi's fanboy attitude and tries to evade him. Eventually, Bodi and Scattergood get lost in a back alley and Bodi decides to play music at Rock and Roll Park to get money for Scattergood to return to his mansion. However, Riff and Skozz mistakenly kidnap Scattergood after they see Bodi at the park. After Riff and Skozz realize their error, Linnux angrily sends them to find Bodi again and they drop Scattergood off at his home. Scattergood believes his career is over since he has less than a day to write a new song, when he hears Bodi playing on his guitar and invites him into his home with the facade of a "guitar lesson", creating a new song called "Glorious". Bodi later realizes that Angus used him after hearing him take full credit for the song they wrote together on a radio. Trey mocks Bodi and everyone in the park leaves, with Darma and Germur feeling sorry for him. Soon after, Bodi is captured by Linnux's henchmen via tranquilizer darts, and under their effects he reveals the fake Mastiff guards when Linnux interrogates him. Linnux and his gang head to Snow Mountain while Bodi is put into a boxing match at Linnux's Fight Palace, but Bodi cleverly has his opponent break the cage surrounding them so he can escape.

Scattergood, guilt-tripped by Ozzie for exploiting Bodi for his own selfishness, uses his old tour bus to find him and apologize. At Rock and Roll Park, Scattergood meets with Darma and Germur and discover Bodi's capture when they see his dart-covered guitar. Scattergood forgoes sending in his new song to rescue Bodi. Meeting Bodi outside of Linnux's hideout, Scattergood makes amends by giving his old acoustic guitar with his autograph as a sign of gratitude and takes him to Snow Mountain to stop Linnux and his henchmen. Linnux and his gang overpower Khampa and the whole village and attempt to devour the villagers, but Bodi appears. After a climactic chase, Bodi subdues the wolves by "finding the fire" by playing Scattergood's guitar and making the wolves, the villagers, and his friends levitate. Khampa banishes Linnux with his Iron Paw and accepts Bodi's ambition to play rock music.

At the city, Scattergood gives full credit of "Glorious" to Bodi. Bodi forms a band with Darma and Germur as they (including Scattergood, Ozzie, Fleetwood, and the sheeps) sing and play "Glorious" to the city, the Snow Mountain villagers, Khampa, and most of the redeemed wolves (including Riff and Skozz) at Linnux's old Fight Palace. Meanwhile, Trey tries to get in the Fight Palace claiming that he's with the band only to be turned away by a bear bouncer.

Voice cast

 Luke Wilson / Guo Qilin as Bodi, a young Tibetan Mastiff who is eternally optimistic and wants nothing more than to play rock music. Conflicted between his sense of duty at home and pursuing his dream in the city, Bodi is determined to be in a rock band and make his dad proud.
 Adam Friedman does Bodi's English singing voice. including the  final song "Glorious".
 J. K. Simmons / Guo Degang as Khampa, Bodi's father, an elder Tibetan Mastiff who takes his duties as the village guard extremely seriously and despises music after defeating the wolves at one point while letting his guard down. Although he may be too militaristic or overly suspicious of outside threat, he's motivated by his love for the villagers and his son.
Eddie Izzard / Lu Zhixing (陆志兴) as Angus Scattergood (安格斯·史卡特古德), a British Persian cat who is a rock legend suffering from a serious case of songwriter's block. With enormous pressure from his record label to release a new hit single, he hides away in his grandiose mansion with Ozzie, his robot butler as his only companion.
 Lewis Black / Yu Qian as Linnux, the CEO of Linnux Industries, alpha male wolf of a sinister wolf gang, and club owner of the Fight Palace.
 Kenan Thompson / Sun Yue (孙悦) as Riff, the smallest henchman with the biggest ego in the wolf pack. He tries to take on jobs bigger than himself just to impress his boss Linnux, but they almost always result in epic failure due to the lack of unity between him and his absentminded partner, Skozz.
 Mae Whitman / Shao Bing (邵兵) as Darma, a red fox who has been playing her bass guitar at Rock n’ Roll Park for years, knowing that persistence and hard work will get her somewhere.
 Jorge Garcia / Zhu Yunfeng (朱云峰) as Germur (格尔穆尔), the most mellow goat around that can wail on a drum set like no other. Although he is often forgetful or mentally checked-out, he can get along with just about anybody.
 Matt Dillon / Liu Yun as Trey (特雷), an arrogant and egotistic snow leopard bounty hunter who is sent by Linnux to capture Bodi and finds pleasure in humiliating any opposition he has. Like the best schoolyard basketball players, his great talent on the electric guitar is overshadowed by his inability to play well with others.
 Sam Elliott / Feng Xiaogang as Fleetwood Yak, a wise elder yak with many stories to tell and also breaks the fourth wall to address the viewers about certain things. Having left the city life long ago, he has found peace living in Snow Mountain among the happy band of sheep, Bodi, and his old friend Khampa. His name is a pun on the British rock band, Fleetwood Mac.
 Liza Richardson as Radio DJ, she is heard on the radio that plays.
 Ash Brannon as Ian, Scattergood's agent who is only heard when he talks to Scattergood on the phone.
 Will Finn as Floyd, a sheep barber.
 Finn also voices Carl, a sheep.

Additional voices provided by Julie Craig, Deng Feng, Kellen Goff, Jennifer Hale, and Maddie Taylor.

Production
The film was animated by Reel FX, which produced Free Birds (2013) and the Golden Globe-nominated The Book of Life (2014).

The film cost $60 million to make, and thus making it the most expensive Chinese-financed animated productions. Rock Dog is based on a graphic novel, written and illustrated by Chinese rockstar Zheng Jun.

Release
The film premiered at the Shanghai International Film Festival, which took place between June 11 and June 19, 2016. It was released in China on July 8, 2016. In the United States, the film was theatrically released on February 24, 2017, by Lionsgate through its Summit Premiere label.

Home media
Rock Dog was released on Digital HD on May 9, 2017, and on DVD and Blu-ray on May 23, 2017.

Reception

Box office
Rock Dog grossed $9.4 million in the United States and $14.7 million in other territories for a worldwide total of $24.1 million, against a production budget of $60 million.

In the United States, Rock Dog was released alongside Collide and Get Out, and was expected to gross $6–7 million from 2,077 theaters in its opening weekend. It ended up grossing just $3.7 million, finishing 11th at the box office and marking one of the worst-ever debuts for a film playing in over 2,000 theaters.

The film had a poor opening weekend in China, eventually earning $5.7 million. It was suggested that the largest Chinese theater chain, Wanda Cinema Line, attempted to limit the number of screens the film would be shown on. The film was shown only on seven of Wanda's screens—0.3 percent of all its screens in China. Huayi Bros., the film's production company and an owner of a competing theater chain, poached Wanda's executive Jerry Ye a few months before the film's release and made him CEO of its film division.

Critical response
On review aggregator website Rotten Tomatoes, the film has an approval rating of 46% based on 56 reviews, with an average rating of 5.30/10. The site's critical consensus reads, "Rock Dog is amiable enough, but its second-tier animation and uninspired story add up to a movie whose meager charms are likely to escape all but the youngest and least demanding viewers." On Metacritic, which assigns a weighted average to reviews, the film has a score 48 out of 100, based on 16 critics, indicating "mixed or average reviews". Audiences polled by CinemaScore gave the film an average grade of "B+" on an A+ to F scale.

Release controversy
During its original theatrical run, Wanda Cinema Line withheld most Chinese theaters from showing Rock Dog, limiting the movie's box office in China. Allegedly this was due to a conflict with Huayi Bros.

Accolades

Sequels
In November 2019, it was reported that Splash Entertainment was making a sequel to the film taking place a year later where Bodi and his band True Blue, working with pop sensation Lil' Foxy, learns about the price of fame and being true to yourself. Rock Dog 2: Rock Around the Park was made available for digital download on June 11, 2021, which was followed by a June 15 release for DVD and Blu-ray. 

The next sequel Rock Dog 3: Battle the Beat, where Bodi is compelled to join the show to restore the Rock Legend’s good name. None of the original cast members reprised their roles for both sequels except Izzard. It was released on DVD, Blu-ray and digital download on January 24, 2023.

References

External links

Rock Dog on Rotten Tomatoes

2016 films
2016 directorial debut films
Chinese-language films
English-language Chinese films
2010s children's comedy films
2010s American animated films
2016 computer-animated films
American multilingual films
American children's animated adventure films
American children's animated comedy films
American computer-animated films
Animated films about cats
Animated films about dogs
Animated films about foxes
Animated films about animals
Animated films based on novels
Animated films based on manhua
Chinese adventure films
Chinese animated films
Chinese children's films
Anime-influenced Western animation
Films based on Chinese comics
Films directed by Ash Brannon
Animated films about wolves
American rock music films
Chinese multilingual films
Chinese rock music films
Huayi Brothers films
Lionsgate animated films
Summit Entertainment animated films
Summit Entertainment films
Reel FX Creative Studios films
Animated films about friendship
Films scored by Rolfe Kent
2016 comedy films
Films about Tibet
Films set in China
2010s English-language films